Isortoq Fjord is a fjord in the Qeqqata municipality in western Greenland. The fjord to the east of Maniitsoq, emptying into Davis Strait. Majorqaq, one of the widest rivers in western Greenland draining the Greenland ice sheet, empties into the fjord head.

Geography 

Settlement 

The shores of the fjord are uninhabited.

References 

Davis Strait
Fjords of Greenland